Wolfert was an unincorporated community located within East Greenwich Township in Gloucester County, New Jersey, United States.

History
An early settler was Solomon Lippincott, who purchased  of land at that location in 1741.  In 1756, a local branch of the Society of Friends used Lippincott's home as a place of worship.  "Solomons Graveyard" (extant) was established on the property, the earliest burials dating from 1795.

A branch of the West Jersey Railroad was constructed in 1871, and a station was erected in Wolfert.

References

East Greenwich Township, New Jersey
Unincorporated communities in Gloucester County, New Jersey
Unincorporated communities in New Jersey